Machine Music is a 1978 album by John White and Gavin Bryars. The album was the eighth release on Brian Eno's Obscure Records.

This release had the catalogue number Obscure OBS 8. In common with most of the releases on Obscure it was recorded at Basing Street Studios in London, produced by Brian Eno and engineered by Rhett Davies.

The Bryars' composition The Squirrel and the Ricketty Racketty Bridge features four guitarists, each playing two guitars simultaneously. 

Track listing and personnel

Side one
All compositions by John White
Autumn Countdown Machine - Tuba, Metronome, Percussion – John White, Double Bass – Sandra Hill, Double Bass, Percussion  – Gavin Bryars, Bassoon, Percussion – Christopher Hobbs
Son Of Gothic Chord - Piano – Christopher Hobbs, John White
Jew's Harp Machine - Jew's Harp – Christopher Hobbs, Gavin Bryars, John White, Michael Nyman
Drinking And Hooting Machine - Percussion (Bottle) – Brian Eno, Christopher Hobbs, Gavin Bryars, John White, Susan Dorey

Side two
Composition by Gavin Bryars
The Squirrel And The Ricketty Racketty Bridge - Electric Guitar – Brian Eno, Fred Frith, Guitar – Gavin Bryars, Acoustic Guitar – Derek Bailey

References

External links
Discogs entry on album

Albums produced by Brian Eno
1978 albums
Obscure Records albums